This is a list of the American Billboard magazine Hot 100 number-ones of 1994. There were 10 singles that topped the chart this year. The first of these, "Hero" by Mariah Carey, spent three weeks at the top, concluding a four-week run that had begun in December 1993. The longest running number-one single of 1994 is "I'll Make Love to You" by Boyz II Men, which logged 14 weeks at number-one, tying the song with "I Will Always Love You" by Whitney Houston for the most weeks at number-one on the Billboard Hot 100 until "One Sweet Day" by Mariah Carey and Boyz II Men stayed atop the chart from December 1995 to the first quarter of 1996.

With the rise of "On Bended Knee" to the top of the Hot 100, Boyz II Men became the first act to chart consecutive number-one singles in the United States since The Beatles charted three consecutive number-one singles in 1964.

Furthermore, Lisa Loeb became the first artist to reach #1 with "Stay (I Missed You)" before signing to any record label.

That year, 7 acts earned their first number one song: Celine Dion, Ace of Base, R. Kelly, All-4-One, Lisa Loeb & Nine Stories, and Ini Kamoze. Sting, already having hit number one with The Police, earned his first number one song as a solo act. Boyz II Men was the only act to hit number one more than once, by hitting twice.

Chart history

Number-one artists

See also
1994 in music
List of Billboard number-one singles

References

Additional sources
Fred Bronson's Billboard Book of Number 1 Hits, 5th Edition
Joel Whitburn's Top Pop Singles 1955-2008, 12 Edition
Joel Whitburn Presents the Billboard Hot 100 Charts: The Nineties
Additional information obtained can be verified within Billboard's online archive services and print editions of the magazine.

United States Hot 100
1994